The 1831 Maine gubernatorial election took place on September 12, 1831. Incumbent Democratic Governor Samuel E. Smith defeated National Republican candidate Daniel Goodenow.

Results

Notes

References 

Maine
Gubernatorial
1831
September 1831 events